This is a list of transfers in Serbian football for the 2012 winter transfer window.
Only moves featuring a Serbian SuperLiga side are listed.
The order by which the clubs are listed is equal to the classification of the SuperLiga at the end of the current half-season, 2012–13.

Serbian SuperLiga

Partizan Belgrade

In:

Out:

Red Star Belgrade

In:

Out:

FK Jagodina

In:

Out:

FK Vojvodina

In:

Out:

Rad Beograd

In:

Out:

Javor Ivanjica

In:

Out:

Sloboda Užice

In:

Out:

Spartak ZV Subotica

In:

Out:

OFK Beograd

In:

 

Out:

FK Novi Pazar

In:

Out:

Donji Srem

In:

Out:

Radnički Niš

In:

Out:

BSK Borča

In:

Out:

Hajduk Kula

In:

Out:

Radnički 1923 Kragujevac

In:

Out:

FK Smederevo

In:

Out:

See also
Serbian SuperLiga
2012–13 Serbian SuperLiga
List of Serbian football transfers summer 2012

References

External sources
 Sportske.net information agency.
 SuperLiga news at Sportski žurnal website.
 Sportal.rs information agency.
 Srpskifudbal.rs football website. Transfers page
 Superliga.rs

Serbian SuperLiga
2012–13
transfers